Lee Yeon-doo (born Lee Hyun-kyung on June 20, 1984) is a South Korean actress.

Personal life 
Lee and her non-celebrity boyfriend have been in a relationship for about a year and will be married on October 9, 2021.

Filmography

Television series

Film

Variety show

Music video appearance

Theater

References

External links

 
Lee Yeon-doo at Daum 
Lee Yeon-doo at Naver Movies 

Actresses from Seoul
South Korean film actresses
South Korean television actresses
South Korean television personalities
Living people
1984 births
Dong-ah Institute of Media and Arts alumni
21st-century South Korean actresses